Bianca Deiandra "Blush" Atterberry is an American songwriter and producer. Atterberry has co-written for Demi Lovato, Blackpink, K. Michelle, Mary J. Blige, Macy Gray, and Meghan Trainor, among others.

Songwriting credits

Credits are courtesy of Discogs, Tidal, Apple Music, and AllMusic.

Filmography

Awards and nominations

References 

African-American songwriters
American rhythm and blues singer-songwriters
Living people
1988 births